Robert Tyndale (fl. 1417–1419) of Devizes, Wiltshire, was an English politician.

He was a Member (MP) of the Parliament of England for Devizes in 1417 and 1419.

References

14th-century births
15th-century deaths
English MPs 1417
People from Devizes
English MPs 1419